This is a list of Turkmenistan national football team's all kinds of competitive records.

Individual records

Player records

Most capped players

Top goalscorers

Manager records

Team records

Competition records

FIFA World Cup

AFC Asian Cup

2010 AFC Challenge Cup was used to determine qualification for the 2011 AFC Asian Cup qualification

Asian Games

Note: As of 2002, only U23 teams are allowed to participate in the Asian Games' football tournament.

AFC Challenge Cup

Central Asian Championship

RCD Cup/ECO Cup

Head-to-head record 
The list shown below shows the Turkmenistan national football team all-time international record against opposing nations.

 Turkmenistan was supposed to face Brunei in the 2014 AFC Challenge Cup qualifiers but the latter withdrew from the tournament. Turkmenistan was awarded a 3-goal victory for the supposed match.

FIFA ranking record

References 

 FIFA.com
 World Football Elo Ratings: Turkmenistan

records
National association football team records and statistics